Özboynuinceli is a village in Silifke district of Mersin Province, Turkey. It is situated in high plateau of the northern slopes of the Taurus Mountains. The settled population of the village was 228 as of 2012. But during the summer, the population increases because of the resort characteristics of the village(see yayla). The main economic activity is farming.

References

Villages in Silifke District